Kumkuyu is a town in Mersin Province, Turkey.

Geography

Kumkuyu is a Mediterranean coastal town in the rural area of Erdemli ilçe (district) which is a part of Mersin Province. It is on the Turkish state highway  which traverses south Anatolia from west to east. Its population was 2,692 as of 2020.

History

The vicinity of the town had been inhabited in the ancient ages. There is a  big aqueduct as well as cisterns, rock tanks for olive oil and the ruins of a fort against pirates constructed during Roman Empire. (Kanlıdivane, the ancient religious center is a few kilometers north of Kumkuyu.) But modern settlement began only after the 1950s. The residents of Kumkuyu are the members of a former nomadic Turkmen (Oghuz Turk) tribe named Tırtar. (The former name of the settlement was Tırtar) . In 1989 Kumkuyu was declared a township.

Economy

Agriculture, especially greenhouse cultivation, has replaced the traditional animal husbandry. The main crops are citrus and bananas.  The tourism potential (historic and beach) is promising. At the moment there are a few holiday hotels on the coastline, but the number is on the rise.

See also 
Akkale

References

Populated places in Mersin Province
Populated coastal places in Turkey
Seaside resorts in Turkey
Towns in Turkey
Tourist attractions in Mersin Province
Populated places in Erdemli District